Eric Berry (9 January 1913 – 2 September 1993) was a British stage and film actor.

Biography 
Eric Berry was born in London on 9 January 1913 to parents Frederick William Berry and Anna Lovisa Danielson. He attended the City of London School and trained for the stage at the Royal Academy of Dramatic Art. Berry was briefly married to actress Constance Carpenter. He died of cancer on 2 September 1993 in Laguna Beach, California.

Career 
Eric Berry made his first stage appearance in April 1931 in a production of Spilt Milk at what was then known as the Everyman Theatre, Hampstead. He made his West End theatre debut the following year in a production of The Cathedral at what is now the Noël Coward Theatre, then referred to as the New Theatre. Berry first appeared on Broadway in September 1954 as Percival Browne in a production of The Boy Friend at the Royale Theatre, a production which set a record for the longest-running Broadway production of a British musical. In 1972, Pippin opened at the Imperial Theatre starring Eric Berry as Charles, a part he would perform for the show's six-year Broadway run. Berry performed in a number of other productions on Broadway, including The Two Gentlemen of Verona in 1958, The Great God Brown in 1959, and Gideon in 1961.

From 1937 through 1983, Eric Berry also appeared in films and on television. Films in which Berry appeared include The Red Shoes in 1948, Miss Robin Hood in 1952, Escape by Night in 1953 and the 1961 adaptation of The Light that Failed. Teleplays in which Berry appeared include Sunday Night Theatre in 1950 and 1951, Play of the Week in 1960, and Bob Hope Presents the Chrysler Theatre in 1963. He appeared in an episode of The Asphalt Jungle in 1961.

Filmography

Film

Television

Notes

External links

1913 births
1993 deaths
Alumni of RADA
English male stage actors
People educated at the City of London School
20th-century English male actors
Male actors from London
English male film actors
English male television actors
Deaths from cancer in California